Dark Red Roses is a 1929 British film directed by Sinclair Hill. The film includes a sequence featuring the Ballets Russes choreographed by George Balanchine.

Cast
 Stewart Rome as David  
 Frances Doble as Laura
 Hugh Eden as Anton  
 Kate Cutler as Mother 
 Jack Clayton as Jack 
 Jill Clayton as Jill  
 Sydney Morgan as Tim
 Una O'Connor as Mrs Weaks
 George Balanchine, Anton Dolin and Lydia Lopokova as the dancers

References

External links

1929 films
British black-and-white films
Films directed by Sinclair Hill
British silent feature films
1920s English-language films